Bukidnon's 2nd congressional district is one of the four congressional districts of the Philippines in the province of Bukidnon. It has been represented in the House of Representatives since 1987. The district encompasses the provincial capital city of Malaybalay and the entire eastern frontier of Bukidnon bordering the Caraga and Davao regions. Its municipalities are Cabanglasan, Impasugong, Lantapan and San Fernando. Prior to redistricting in 2012, the district also covered the city of Valencia. It is currently represented in the 18th Congress by Jonathan Keith Flores of the PDP–Laban.

Representation history

Election results

2019

2016

2013

2010

See also
Legislative districts of Bukidnon

References

Congressional districts of the Philippines
Politics of Bukidnon
1987 establishments in the Philippines
Congressional districts of Northern Mindanao
Constituencies established in 1987